Rhimphalea lindusalis is a moth in the family Crambidae. It was described by Francis Walker in 1859. It is found on Borneo, the Solomon Islands and Australia, where it has been recorded from Queensland.

References

Spilomelinae
Moths described in 1859